Eochrois is a genus of moths of the family Oecophoridae.

Species
Eochrois acutella  (Walker, 1864)
Eochrois aetopis  (Meyrick, 1889)
Eochrois anaemica  (Turner, 1916)
Eochrois anthophora  (Turner, 1944)
Eochrois argyraspis  (Lower, 1897)
Eochrois atypa  (Turner, 1946)
Eochrois callianassa  (Meyrick, 1883)
Eochrois caminias  (Meyrick, 1889)
Eochrois chrysias  (Lower, 1901)
Eochrois cuphosema  (Turner, 1946)
Eochrois cycnodes  (Meyrick, 1889)
Eochrois dejunctella  (Walker, 1864)
Eochrois ebenosticha  (Turner, 1917)
Eochrois epidesma  (Meyrick, 1886)
Eochrois epitoxa  (Meyrick, 1889)
Eochrois hebes  (Turner, 1946)
Eochrois holarga  (Turner, 1936)
Eochrois holochra  (Turner, 1946)
Eochrois leiochroa  Lower, 1907
Eochrois leucocrossa  (Meyrick, 1889)
Eochrois malacopis  (Meyrick, 1889)
Eochrois mesodesma  Lower, 1898
Eochrois monophaes  (Meyrick, 1884)
Eochrois pandora  (Turner, 1917)
Eochrois phoenopis  (Turner, 1940)
Eochrois platyphaea  (Turner, 1939)
Eochrois pulverulenta  (Meyrick, 1883)
Eochrois rubrilinea  (Turner, 1947)
Eochrois sarcoxantha  (Lower, 1893)
Eochrois trisema  Lower, 1907

References

Markku Savela's ftp.funet.fi

 
Oecophorinae
Moth genera